The following is a list of events affecting Canadian television in 1961. Events listed include television show debuts, finales, cancellations, and channel launches.

Events
 Reach for the Top broadcasts for the first time on CBUT. Four years later the show launches nationally on CBC.
 CHCH becomes an independent station after seven years of CBC network affiliation.
 October 1 - The Canadian Television Network launches as Canada's second national television network. The original affiliates are CFCN, CHAN, CJAY, CFTO, CJCH, CFCF, CJOH, and CFRN which was a former CBC affiliate.
 The CTV National News airs its first broadcast not long after the launch of CTN. The original anchors are Peter Jennings, Charles Lynch and Peter Stursberg. The show gets off to a slow start but soon becomes the network's highest rated program.

Debuts

Ending this year

Births 
February 24 - Lynette Gillis, Actress, voice actress and singer
September 16 - Jen Tolley, Actress, voice actress and singer

Television shows

1950s
 Country Canada (1954–2007)
 CBC News Magazine (1952–1981)
 Chez Hélène (1959–1973)
 Circle 8 Ranch (1955–1978)
 Don Messer's Jubilee (1957–1969)
 The Friendly Giant (1958–1985)
 Front Page Challenge (1957–1995)
 Hockey Night in Canada (1952–present)
 Maggie Muggins (1955–1962)
 The National (1954–present)
 Open House (1952–1962)
 Wayne and Shuster Show (1958–1989)

1960s
 A Case for the Court (1960–1962)
 Club 6 (1960–1962)
 The Nature of Things (1960–present, scientific documentary series)

Television stations

Debuts

Network affiliation changes

See also
 1961 in Canada
 List of Canadian films

References

External links
CBC Directory of Television Series at Queen’s University (Archived March 4, 2016)